Vitali Kiryushchenkov (born January 31, 1992) is a Belarusian professional ice hockey forward currently playing for Metallurg Zhlobin of the Belarusian Extraleague.

Kiryushchenkov previously played for HC Dinamo Minsk of the Kontinental Hockey League during the 2013–14 KHL season. He played thirty regular season games and scored two goals and one assist.

References

External links

1992 births
Living people
Belarusian ice hockey forwards
HC Dinamo Minsk players
HC Donbass players
HK Kremenchuk players
HK Neman Grodno players
Yunost Minsk players